The left border of heart (or left margin, or obtuse margin) is shorter than the right border, full, and rounded: it is formed mainly by the left ventricle, but to a slight extent, above, by the left atrium.

It extends from a point in the second left intercostal space, about 2.5 mm. from the sternal margin, obliquely downward, with a convexity to the left, to the apex of the heart.

References

External links
 

Cardiac anatomy